David John Acheson (born 1946) is a British applied mathematician at Jesus College, Oxford.

He was educated at Highgate School, King's College London (BSc Mathematics and Physics, 1967) and the University of East Anglia (PhD, 1971). He was appointed a Fellow in Mathematics at Jesus College, Oxford in 1977 and became an Emeritus Fellow in 2008. He served as president of the Mathematical Association from 2010 to 2011. He was awarded an Honorary Doctorate of Science from the University of East Anglia in 2013.

His early research was on geophysical and astrophysical fluid dynamics, beginning with the discovery in 1972 of a magnetic 'field gradient' instability in rotating fluids. In 1976, he discovered the first examples of wave over-reflection (i.e. reflection coefficient greater than unity) in a stable system. In 1978 his research focused on magnetic fields and differential rotation in stars, with new results on magnetic buoyancy, the Taylor instability, Goldreich-Schubert instability, and magnetorotational instability. In 1992 he discovered the 'upside-down pendulums theorem' (which is very loosely connected with the Indian Rope Trick).

Books 
 Elementary Fluid Dynamics (1990)
 From Calculus to Chaos (1997)
 1089 and All That (2002)
 The Calculus Story: A Mathematical Adventure (2017)
 The Wonder Book of Geometry: A Mathematical Story (2020)
 The Spirit of Mathematics: Algebra and All That (2023)

References 

1946 births
Living people
People educated at Highgate School
Alumni of King's College London
Alumni of the University of East Anglia
Fellows of Jesus College, Oxford
Place of birth missing (living people)
20th-century British mathematicians
21st-century British mathematicians
Mathematics writers
Fluid dynamicists
British non-fiction writers
20th-century British writers
21st-century British writers
20th-century British male writers
Male non-fiction writers